Harry Island is an island off the coast of mainland Antarctica, in the Palmer Archipelago.

Features and discovery 
The icecapped island is dominated by a truncated pyramidal peak, lying at the southeast entrance to the channel between Brabant Island and Liège Island. It was discovered by the Belgian Antarctic Expedition under Gerlache, 1897–99, and named for  Gerard Harry, Belgian journalist and promoter of the expedition. The island was photographed from the air by FIDASE, 1956-57

See also 
 List of Antarctic and sub-Antarctic islands

References

Islands of the Palmer Archipelago